Stephen Eric Zimmerman Jr. (born September 9, 1996) is an American professional basketball player for Rizing Zephyr Fukuoka of the Japanese B.League. He played college basketball for UNLV before being selected with the 41st overall pick in the 2016 NBA draft by the Orlando Magic.

High school career

Zimmerman attended Bishop Gorman High School in Las Vegas, Nevada, where he led the Gaels to four straight state championships, becoming the only player in Nevada history to accomplish the feat at the large-school level. His 114 career wins also made him the winningest player in school history. As a senior in 2014–15, Zimmerman averaged 14.7 points, 10.1 rebounds, 4.2 assists, 1.2 steals and 2.4 blocks per game. He subsequently earned selection to the McDonald's All-American Game and the Jordan Brand Classic.

College career
Zimmerman played one season of college basketball for UNLV. As a freshman in 2015–16, he played in 26 games, made 24 starts, and averaged 10.5 points, a team-high 8.7 rebounds and a team-high 1.96 blocks in 26.2 minutes per game. He ranked second in the Mountain West Conference in blocked shots and third in rebounding. He scored in double figures 17 times, including a career-high 21 points on February 2 against New Mexico. He pulled down 10+ rebounds 13 times, including a career-best 16 boards on January 19 against Utah State.

On March 28, 2016, Zimmerman declared for the NBA draft, forgoing his final three years of college eligibility.

Professional career

Orlando Magic (2016–2017)
On June 23, 2016, Zimmerman was selected by the Orlando Magic with the 41st overall pick in the 2016 NBA draft. On July 7, 2016, he signed with the Magic. During his rookie season, Zimmerman had multiple assignments with the Erie BayHawks, the Magic's D-League affiliate. He also played in 19 games with Orlando, averaging 1.2 points, 1.8 rebounds and 5.7 minutes per game. On July 4, 2017, Zimmerman was waived by the Magic.

South Bay Lakers (2017–2018)
On August 9, 2017, Zimmerman signed with the Los Angeles Lakers. On October 9, 2017, he was waived by the Lakers.  He would later be acquired by the South Bay Lakers of the NBA G League as an affiliate player of Los Angeles.

Westchester Knicks (2018–2019)
On August 22, 2018, Zimmerman was selected by the Capital City Go-Go of the G League in the 2018 expansion draft. The next day he was traded to the Westchester Knicks for Chasson Randle.

Telekom Baskets Bonn (2019–2020)
On August 7, 2019, Zimmerman joined Telekom Baskets Bonn. He averaged 7.4 points and 4.3 rebounds per game.

Basketball Nymburk (2020–2021)
On September 1, 2020, Zimmerman signed with Polski Cukier Toruń of the Polish Basketball League (PLK). On September 17, he signed with Basketball Nymburk of the Czech National Basketball League.

Cairns Taipans (2021–2022)
On September 17, 2021, Zimmerman signed with the Cairns Taipans for the 2021–22 NBL season.

Austin Spurs (2022)
On October 18, 2022, Zimmerman signed with the Austin Spurs. On November 18, he was waived after appearing in 1 game, recording 8 points and 9 rebounds.

NBA career statistics

Regular season

|-
| align="left"| 
| align="left"| Orlando
| 19 || 0 || 5.7 || .323 || .000 || .600 || 1.8 || .2 || .1 || .3 || 1.2
|-
| align="left" | Career
| align="left" |
| 19 || 0 || 5.7 || .323 || .000 || .600 || 1.8 || .2 || .1 || .3 || 1.2

References

External links 

UNLV Runnin' Rebels bio

1996 births
Living people
American expatriate basketball people in Australia
American men's basketball players
Austin Spurs players
Basketball players from Nevada
Bishop Gorman High School alumni
Cairns Taipans players
Centers (basketball)
Erie BayHawks (2008–2017) players
McDonald's High School All-Americans
Orlando Magic draft picks
Orlando Magic players
People from Hendersonville, Tennessee
South Bay Lakers players
Sportspeople from Las Vegas
UNLV Runnin' Rebels basketball players
Westchester Knicks players
United States men's national basketball team players